Arzila is a former civil parish in the municipality of Coimbra, Portugal. The population in 2011 was 655, in an area of 3.45 km2. On 28 January 2013 it merged with Taveiro and Ameal to form Taveiro, Ameal e Arzila. There's a Moroccan city with the same name, indicating its etymology is of Arabic origin.

It's home to the Paul de Arzila, a natural reserve with a large number of species of birds among other animals. Its patron Immaculate Conception is celebrated annually on 8 December.

References 

Former parishes of Coimbra